The Director of Immigration is the head of the Immigration Department of the Hong Kong Government, which is responsible for immigration issues and controlling entry ports into Hong Kong. Decisions to reject people from entering are made by front-line staff at control points, not made by the Director himself/herself.

List of Directors of Immigration

British Administration
 J. Moore (1961-1965)
 W. E. Collard (1965-1974)
 J. M. Rowlands (1974-1978)
 R. G. B. Bridge (1978-1983) - previously Secretary for the Civil Service
 A. J. Carter (1983-1989) - last British appointment
  (1989-1996) - first localised holder of the position
 Regina Ip (1996-1997)

Post Handover

References

External links
Government of HKSAR
Organisation chart of Hong Kong Government

Immigration
Immigration to Hong Kong